The Assassin Next Door is an Israeli action drama film directed by Danny Lerner in 2009. The primary language is English with many scenes in Russian and Hebrew with English subtitles.

Plot
Galia is a Ukrainian sex slave working in Tel Aviv who attempts to escape with another woman. They are captured and beaten and she watches her friend stabbed to death. She demands to be released and a Russian mobster feels she is smart and strong enough to fill another role. She is told to assassinate a man in a coffee shop and is successful. She is then given an apartment and a pittance.

She performs intermittent assassinations while trying to earn money and to have her passport returned to her so she can return to Ukraine and re-unite with her daughter. She is troubled, though, by the noise of her neighbor constantly beating his wife Elinor. She reaches out to her neighbor and offers friendship, as she can relate to her situation having formerly also been a battered wife.

Galia and Elinor develop a very affectionate friendship. Galia performs her last hit but then the mafia turns on her and attempts to kill her. She then robs the mafia of the money she is owed and attempts to get Elinor to run away with her. At first she is not successful until Elinor stabs her husband when he is beating her and she is now pregnant. As they run away together they are pursued by the mafia in a series of bloody shootouts.

Cast 
Olga Kurylenko - 	Galia
Ninet Tayeb - Eleanor
 - Mishka
 - Roni
 - Michael
Zohar Strauss - Eleanor's violent husband
 - Nina
 - Peter
Roy Assaf - Shay
 - Blanit
Ester Rada - Barbie

References

External links

2009 films
2009 action drama films
2000s English-language films
English-language French films
English-language Israeli films
2000s Hebrew-language films
Israeli action drama films
2000s Russian-language films
Films about domestic violence
Films scored by Nathaniel Méchaly
French action drama films
2009 multilingual films
French multilingual films
Israeli multilingual films
2000s French films